The name Cristobal has been used for four tropical cyclones in the Atlantic Ocean. Cristobal replaced the name Cesar after the 1996 season.

 Tropical Storm Cristobal (2002), a relatively weak tropical storm causing only minor damage in Bermuda
 Tropical Storm Cristobal (2008), formed near the South Carolina coast causing minimal damage
 Hurricane Cristobal (2014), a Category 1 hurricane that affected Caribbean islands, Bermuda, and the United States East Coast
 Tropical Storm Cristobal (2020), formed over the Bay of Campeche from the remnants of Tropical Storm Amanda from the East Pacific, earliest third named storm in the Atlantic basin; made landfall in Mexico, then slowly turned north into the Gulf of Mexico and made a second landfall in Louisiana as a moderately-strong tropical storm. 

Atlantic hurricane set index articles